Thomas Scheibitz (born 1968 in Radeberg, East Germany) is a German painter and sculptor. Together with Tino Sehgal he created the German pavilion on the 51st Venice Biennale in 2005. He lives and works in Berlin.

Life and work
The son of an East German stonemason, Thomas Scheibitz was born in Radeberg, Germany in 1968. A student of Professor Ralf Kerbach, he studied alongside Frank Nitsche and Eberhard Havekost at the Dresden Art Academy. He started painting and producing sculpture in 1990 and quickly gained international recognition. Through the use of both mediums, he explores the boundary between figuration and abstraction, playing with the traditional genres of landscape, still life and portraiture. According to Roberta Smith, "his sculptures resemble architectural models or fragments of logos; his paintings are vaguely figurative".

Exhibitions
Solo shows include the Institute of Contemporary Arts, London (1999), Berkeley Art Museum, San Francisco (2001), Museum der bildenden Künste, Leipzig (2001), the Stedelijk Museum, Amsterdam (2001), Centre d’Art Contemporain, Geneva (2004), Irish Museum of Modern Art, Dublin (2007), Camden Arts Centre, London (2008), and Musée d' Art Moderne, Luxembourg (2008).

In 2010, the Drawing Room, London, presented "A moving plan B - chapter ONE", a group exhibition of drawings selected by Scheibitz. As well as artists of his own generation - Dirk Bell, Tacita Dean, Thomas Demand, Mathew Hale, Manfred Pernice, Andreas Slominski and Peter Stauss – he also selected those of an older generation born in East Germany - Carl Friedrich Claus, Hermann Glöckner, Manfred Kuttner, A.R. Penck and Eugene Schönebeck.

Select solo shows
 ONE-Time Pad, BALTIC Centre for Contemporary Art, Newcastle, GB, 2013
 ONE-Time Pad, MMK Museum für Moderne Kunst Frankfurt am Main, D, 2012
 A Panoramic View of Basic Events, Tanya Bonakdar Gallery, New York, USA, 2012
 mk/Ultra, Sprüth Magers Berlin, D, 2011
 Lineage ONE / Stilleben & Statistics, Jarla Partilager, Berlin, D, 2011
 Il fiume e le sue fonti, Collezione Maramotti, Reggio Emilia, I, 2011
 Der ungefegte Raum, Galerie im Taxispalais, Innsbruck, A, 2010
 A moving plan B – chapter TWO, Sprüth Magers, London, GB, 2010
 A moving plan B — chapter ONE, ausgewählt von / selected by Thomas Scheibitz, Drawing Room, London, GB, 2010
 A.C.G.T., Produzentengalerie Hamburg, D, 2009
 The Missing Link in Delphi, Tanya Bonakdar Gallery, New York, USA, 2009
 The Goldilocks Zone, Sprüth Magers Berlin, D, 2008
 about 90 elements / TOD IM DSCHUNGEL, Camden Arts Centre, London, GB, IMMA Irish Museum of Modern Art, Dublin, IE, 2007
 , 51. Biennale Venedig, Deutscher Pavillon, I, 2005
 ABC - I II III, Centre d'Art Contemporain, Genf, CH, 2004
 , Tanya Bonakdar Gallery, New York, USA, 2002
 I-geometrica B, Matrix i95 Berkeley Art Museum, San Francisco, USA, 2001
 BANNISTER DIAMOND, Stedelijk Museum, Amsterdam, NL, 2001
 Pablo Picasso x Thomas Scheibitz: Sign Scene Lexicon, Berggruen Museum, Berlin, 2019–2020

Select group shows
 William S. Burroughs: Retrospective, Deichtorhallen Hamburg, Falckenberg Collection, Hamburg, D, 2013
 Don’t Be Shy, Don’t Hold Back – The Logan Collection at SMOMA, San Francisco Museum of Modern Art, San Francisco, CA, USA, 2012
 Fruits de la Passion, Centre Georges Pompidou, Paris, F, 2012
 Common Ground, 13th International Architecture Exhibition, La Biennale di Venezia, IT, 2012
 If not in this period of time — Contemporary German Painting, Museu de Arte de São Paulo, BR, 2010
 cargo, Autocenter, Berlin, D, 2009
 Constellations: Paintings from the MCA Collection, Museum of Contemporary Art, Chicago, USA, 2009
 , Kunst- und Ausstellungshalle der Bundesrepublik Deutschland, Bonn, D, 2009
 , Pinakothek der Moderne, München / Munich, D, 2009
 WALL ROCKETS: Contemporary Artists and Ed Ruscha, The FLAG Art Foundation, New York, USA, 2008
 The Krautcho Club / In and out of Place, Forgotten Bar Project, Berlin, D, 2008
 Multiplex: Directions in Art, 1970 to Now, MoMA — Museum of Modern Art, New York, USA, 2007
 Sculptors Drawing, Aspen Art Museum, USA, 2007
 The Artist Dining Room, Tate Modern, Level 2 Gallery, London, GB, 2007
 , Kunstmuseum Winterthur, CH, 2006
 Construction New Berlin, Phoenix Art Museum, USA, 2006
 The Addiction, Gagosian Gallery Berlin, D, 2005
 Drawing from the Modern 1975–2005, MoMA — Museum of Modern Art, New York, USA, 2005
 An Aside, Camden Arts Centre, London, GB, 2005
 26th Biennale São Paulo, BR, 2004
 Art contemporain, de 1960 à nos jours, Centre Pompidou, Paris, F, 2004
 Supernova, Art of the 1990s from the Logan Collection, SFMOMA — San Francisco Museum of Modern Art, USA, 2003
 Berlin-Moskau, Martin-Gropius-Bau, Berlin, D, 2003
 , Museo Correr, 50. Biennale Venedig, I, 2003
 , Frankfurter Kunstverein, D, 2003

Collections
Scheibitz' works are included in major collections, including the Museum of Modern Art, New York; the Albright-Knox Art Gallery, Buffalo; and the National Galleries of Scotland, Edinburgh.

References

External links
Homepage of the Artist including latest exhibition views, images of his sculptures and paintings, and a full biography
Thomas Scheibitz at ArtFacts.net
Thomas Scheibitz at Berliner Poster Verlag
Thomas Scheibitz on re-title.com
Review of Scheibitz at Tanya Bonakdar, The Brooklyn Rail

1968 births
Living people
People from Radeberg
20th-century German painters
20th-century German male artists
German male painters
21st-century German painters
21st-century German male artists
German contemporary artists